Jean Michel (born 28 January 1949 in Lapeyrouse, Puy-de-Dôme) is a French politician. He was the member of the National Assembly for Puy-de-Dôme's 6th constituency from 1997 to 2012 as a member of the Socialiste, radical, citoyen et divers gauche parliamentary group.

The constituency was abolished in the 2010 redistricting, with most of the area moved to Puy-de-Dôme's 2nd constituency. Michel did not seek re-election in the 2012 election.

References

1949 births
Living people
People from Puy-de-Dôme
Politicians from Auvergne-Rhône-Alpes
Socialist Party (France) politicians
Deputies of the 11th National Assembly of the French Fifth Republic
Deputies of the 12th National Assembly of the French Fifth Republic
Deputies of the 13th National Assembly of the French Fifth Republic